The red-whiskered bulbul (Pycnonotus jocosus), or crested bulbul, is a passerine bird native to Asia. It is a member of the bulbul family. It is a resident frugivore found mainly in tropical Asia. It has been introduced in many tropical areas of the world where populations have established themselves. It has a loud three or four note call, feeds on fruits and small insects and perches conspicuously on trees. It is common in hill forests and urban gardens.

Taxonomy
The red-whiskered bulbul was formally described by the Swedish naturalist Carl Linnaeus in 1758 in the tenth edition of his Systema Naturae under the binomial name Lanius jocosus. The specific epithet is from Latin ioculus meaning "merry" (from iocus meaning "joke"). Linnaeus based his description on the Sitta Chinensis that had been described in 1757 by the Swedish naturalist Pehr Osbeck. Linnaeus specified the location as "China" but this was restricted to Hong Kong and Kwangtung (now Guangdong) by Herbert Girton Deignan in 1948. The red-whiskered bulbul is now placed in the genus Pycnonotus that was introduced by the German zoologist Friedrich Boie in 1826.

Hybrids have been noted in captivity with the red-vented, white-eared, white-spectacled, black-capped and Himalayan bulbuls. Leucism has also been recorded.

Subspecies
Nine subspecies are recognized:
 P. j. fuscicaudatus - (Gould, 1866): Originally described as a separate species. Found in western and central India. Has a nearly complete breast band and no white tip to tail. 
 P. j. abuensis - (Whistler, 1931): Found in north-western India (type locality Mount Abu) Is pale and has a broken breast band and no white tip to tail.  
 P. j. pyrrhotis - (Bonaparte, 1850): Originally described as a separate species in the genus Ixos. Found in the Terai of northern India and Nepal. It is pale above with white tail tips and a widely separated breast band
 P. j. emeria - (Linnaeus, 1758): Originally described as a separate species in the genus Motacilla. Found from eastern India to south-western Thailand. Is warm brown above with a slim bill and a long crest (also introduced into Florida)
 P. j. whistleri - Deignan, 1948: Found in the Andaman Islands and has a warm brown plumage above, a heavier bill and a shorter crest than P. j. emeria
 P. j. monticola - (Horsfield, 1840): Originally described as a separate species in the genus Ixos. Found from eastern Himalayas to northern Myanmar and southern China and has darker upperparts than P. j. pyrrhotis
 P. j. jocosus - (Linnaeus, 1758): Found in south-eastern China
 P. j. hainanensis - (Hachisuka, 1939): Found on Hainan Island (off south-eastern China)
 P. j. pattani  - Deignan, 1948: Found from southern Myanmar and northern Malay Peninsula through Thailand, southern Indochina and even in java and Sumatra

Description
It has brown upper-parts and whitish underparts with buff flanks and a dark spur running onto the breast at shoulder level. It has a tall pointed black crest, red face patch and thin black moustachial line. The tail is long and brown with white terminal feather tips, but the vent area is red. Juveniles lack the red patch behind the eye, and the vent area is rufous-orange.

The loud and evocative call is a sharp kink-a-joo (also transcribed as pettigrew or kick-pettigrew or pleased to meet you) and the song is a scolding chatter. They are more often heard than seen, but will often perch conspicuously especially in the mornings when they call from the tops of trees. The life span is about 11 years.

Distribution and habitat

This is a bird of lightly wooded areas, more open country with bushes and shrubs, and farmland. Irruptions have been noted from early times with Thomas C. Jerdon noting that they were "periodically visiting Madras and other wooded towns in large flocks."

It has established itself in Australia and in Los Angeles, Hawaii, and Florida in the United States, as well as in Mauritius, on Assumption Island and Mascarene Islands. In Florida, it is only found in a small area, and its population could be extirpated easily.
It was eradicated from Assumption Island in 2013–2015 to prevent colonisation of nearby Aldabra, the largest introduced bird-free tropical island.

The red-whiskered bulbul was introduced by the Zoological and Acclimatization Society in 1880 to Sydney, became well established across the suburbs by 1920, and continued to spread slowly to around 100 km away. It is now also found in suburban Melbourne and Adelaide, although it is unclear how they got there.

Behaviour and ecology

On the island of Réunion, this species established itself and also aided the spread of alien plant species such as Rubus alceifolius. In Florida they feed on fruits and berries of as many as 24 exotic plants including loquat (Eriobotrya japonica), Lantana spp., Brazilian pepper (Schinus terebinthifolius) and figs (Ficus). In Mauritius they aid the dispersal of Ligustrum robustum and Clidemia hirta. Seeds that pass through their gut germinate better. Populations of the red-whiskered bulbul on the island of Reunion have diversified in the course of thirty years and show visible variations in bill morphology according to the food resources that they have adapted to utilize.

Breeding

The breeding season is spread out and peaks from December to May in southern India and March to October in northern India. Breeding may occur once or twice a year. The courtship display of the male involves head bowing, spreading the tail and drooping wings. The nest is cup-shaped, and is built on bushes, thatched walls or small trees. It is woven of fine twigs, roots, and grasses, and embellished with large objects such as bark strips, paper, or plastic bags. Clutches typically contain two or three eggs. Adults (possibly the female) may feign injury to distract potential predators away from the nest. The eggs have a pale mauve ground colour with speckles becoming blotches towards the broad end. Eggs measure 21 mm and are 16 mm wide. Eggs take 12 days to hatch. Both parents take part in raising the young. Young birds are fed on caterpillars and insects which are replaced by fruits and berries as they mature. The chicks are psilopaedic (having down only in the pterylae). Eggs and chicks may be preyed on by the greater coucal and crows.

They defend territories of about  during the breeding season. They roost communally in loose groups of a hundred or more birds.

Food and feeding
The red-whiskered bulbul feeds on fruits (including those of the yellow oleander that are toxic to mammals), nectar and insects.

Health
Several avian malaria parasites have been described from the species. Plasmodium jiangi was first discovered by He and Huang (1993) in this host, in southeast China.

In culture 
This species was once a popular cage bird in parts of India. C. W. Smith noted that 
These birds are in great request among the natives, being of a fearless disposition, and easily reclaimed. They are taught to sit on the hand, and numbers may thus be seen in any Indian bazaar.

The species continues to be a popular cagebird in parts of Southeast Asia.

References

Other sources
 Fraser, F.C. (1930). Note on the nesting habits of the Southern Red-whiskered Bulbul (Otocompsa emeria fuscicaudata). J. Bombay Nat. Hist. Soc. 34(1): 250–252.

External links

Red-whiskered bulbul on the Internet Bird Collection
 
Ageing and sexing

red-whiskered bulbul
Birds of South Asia
Birds of South China
Birds of Southeast Asia
red-whiskered bulbul
red-whiskered bulbul
Birds of Myanmar